Plandampf (scheduled steam) means the hauling of regular trains by steam locomotives, often in conjunction with rolling stock of the same era.  The idea came into being in Germany in the late 1980s. At the beginning, only the additional costs for the steam service were to be borne by the operator. The background was that there were still many operable steam locomotives on the territory of the former German Democratic Republic, the infrastructure was still in place in many places (e.g. sheds, water cranes, coal handling systems, sanding systems) and the usually low maximum speed permitted the use of steam locomotives.

Scheduled steam events are becoming increasingly rare because the necessary infrastructure for steam operation is being lost in the course of modernization of routes. The planned steam at the beginning of the 1990s in East Germany was still relatively common.  After modernization, train speeds increased, and the timetable was designed accordingly, so steam locomotives could not meet the speed requirements.   Another factor was stricter safety requirements, such as automatic closing of doors.

Most planned steam events involve passenger trains but there are also a few freight workings.  In southern Germany, the Bavarian Railway Museum (BEM) established itself as a scheduled steam operator from 2016. It has a stock of sufficiently large locomotives (BR 01, BR 44, BR 50, S 3/6 and BR52), its own route and customers with suitable freight volumes.

References

Preserved steam locomotives of Germany
Heritage railways in Germany